Sarah Jane Courtney (born 1979) is an Australian financial analyst, viticulturist and a former politician.  She was elected to the Tasmanian House of Assembly for the Liberal Party in the Division of Bass at the 2014 state election. As a Senior Minister in the Second Hodgman Ministry, First Gutwein Ministry, and Second Gutwein Ministry, Courtney was responsible for the policy development, service delivery and overall governance of a significant part of the public sector, including accountability for the multibillion-dollar health and education budgets.

Political career

Sarah Courtney unsuccessfully stood for the Senate in the 2013 Australian federal election prior to her entry into state politics.

In March 2018, Courtney was appointed to the Second Hodgman Ministry as Minister for Primary Industries and Water, and Minister for Racing. In October 2018, she stepped down from the role of Minister for Primary Industries and Water while an investigation was carried out, after informing the Premier that she was engaged in a personal relationship with John Whittington, the secretary of the Department of Primary Industries, Parks, Water and the Environment. The inquiry found that there was no inappropriate decision making by Courtney and that all official duties, decisions and actions of the Minister followed appropriate protocols and procedures. Courtney subsequently became Minister for Resources and Minister for Building and Construction to avoid any conflict of interest. Courtney and Whittington later married in 2020, and the latter moved on to the private sector.

In July 2019, Courtney was appointed Minister for Health and Minister for Women. As Health Minister, Courtney steered Tasmania through the COVID-19 pandemic, while concurrently overseeing the commissioning of K-Block at the Royal Hobart Hospital; the largest health infrastructure development ever delivered by the Tasmanian Government.

After the 2021 state election, Courtney was appointed Minister for Education, Minister for Skills, Training and Workforce Growth, Minister for Children and Youth, Minister for Hospitality and Events and Minister for Disability Services. As Minister for Children and Youth, Courtney drove the transition for the Ashley Youth Detention Centre to a new therapeutic model and oversaw the development of a nation-leading Youth Justice reform process.

In late January 2022, Courtney contracted COVID-19 while holidaying in France and was forced to isolate. As a result, she was unable to return to Tasmania to oversee the back-to-school preparations for the start of the school year, and was criticised by Labor and the Greens for "holidaying in Europe for several weeks while stressed parents were preparing to send their children back to school". On 10 February 2022, Courtney announced her resignation from parliament and from the education portfolio. She denied her resignation was related to the criticism she faced for her holiday in France, but instead "was to spend more time with family". Her seat in Bass was filled by Lara Alexander in a countback of votes from the 2021 state election.

On 1 April 2022, Courtney was granted the right to retain the title "The Honourable" for life.

Corporate career

Prior to her political career, Sarah Courtney worked as an Institutional Sales & Equities Analyst at Lodge Partners, and as a Business Development Manager at Regal Funds Management. In September 2009, Courtney established Fish Hook Wines, a boutique vineyard in the Tamar Valley, Tasmania growing Pinot Noir.

References

1979 births
Living people
Liberal Party of Australia members of the Parliament of Tasmania
Members of the Tasmanian House of Assembly
Women members of the Tasmanian House of Assembly
University of Sydney alumni
University of Melbourne alumni
University of Melbourne women
21st-century Australian politicians
21st-century Australian women politicians